The High Life de Belgique (French for High Life of Belgium) is a Belgian publishing house that was founded in 1880.

History 
It publishes annually a directory containing the contact details of more than twelve thousand families of the high society (nobility and upper bourgeoisie), Belgian or foreign, established in Belgium. This directory coexists with the Carnet Mondain; they are the Belgian equivalents of the American Social Register or the  French Bottin Mondain and French High Life.

See also 
 Carnet Mondain
 Social Register
 Libro d'Oro
 Almanach de Bruxelles (defunct)
 Almanach de Gotha
 Burke's peerage
 Belgian nobility
 Bourgeois of Brussels
 Seven Noble Houses of Brussels

References 

Social institutions
Upper class culture in Europe
Genealogy publications
Family history
Series of books
Publishing companies of Belgium
Directories